Selim Çakır (born 15 February 1918) was a Turkish equestrian. He competed in two events at the 1948 Summer Olympics.

References

External links
 

1918 births
Year of death missing
Turkish male equestrians
Olympic equestrians of Turkey
Equestrians at the 1948 Summer Olympics
Place of birth missing
Date of death missing